Finland competed at the 2018 European Athletics Championships in Berlin, Germany, from 6–12 August 2018. A delegation of 41 athletes were sent to represent the country.

The following athletes were selected to compete by the Finnish Amateur Athletic Association.

Results

Men 
Track & road events

Field events

Combined events – Decathlon

Women 

Track & road events

Field events

Combined events – Heptathlon

References

Nations at the 2018 European Athletics Championships
2018
European Athletics Championships